Buck Mountain Episcopal Church is a historic Episcopal church on VA 743, northwest of the junction with VA 633 in Earlysville, Virginia. It is a rare surviving example of the simple wooden Anglican parish churches scattered through Virginia in the colonial period, and is considered one of the finest surviving examples of rural Virginia Greek Revival churches. One of three churches erected to serve Frederick Parish, the original building was completed between 1747 and 1750.  The church was moved to its present site (approximately one mile from its original location) in 1860. Buck Mountain is now a parish church in the Episcopal Diocese of Virginia.

See also

 Episcopal Diocese of Virginia
 Earlysville, Virginia
 Frederick Winslow Hatch
 James Deese

References

External links
 Buck Mountain Episcopal Church website
 Buck Mountain Episcopal Church images, Library of Congress

Churches in Virginia
Churches completed in 1747
Churches in Albemarle County, Virginia
Episcopal churches in Virginia
Greek Revival church buildings in Virginia
19th-century Episcopal church buildings
Virginia Historic Landmarks